The Persian Gulf Veterans National Medal is an honorific military medal authorized by United States Congress presented to members of the U.S. Armed Forces who served in a combat zone during the Persian Gulf War.

See also
U.S. war on Iraq
Iraq-Kuwait War

References

Medals
Gulf War
Iraq War
Persian Gulf